Ghost Alive is the sixth studio album by The Boxer Rebellion, released on 23 March 2018. Four singles were released before the album: "What the Fuck", "Goodnight", "Love Yourself" and "Here I Am". "Love Yourself" was released in conjunction with CALM (Campaign Against Living Miserably) to promote wellbeing in mental health.

The album was a joint production between the band's guitarist Andrew Smith and co-producer, Adam 'Cecil' Bartlett.

Track listing

References

2018 albums
The Boxer Rebellion (band) albums